Anirudh Singh (born 27 January 1977) is the present Member of Legislative Assembly (MLA) from Kasumpti, Shimla, Himachal Pradesh.
 Son of Late Shri Trivikram Singh; born on 27th January, 1977 at Shimla; educated at St. Edward's School, Shimla; married to Smt. Chetna Singh; one son and one daughter; Agriculturist, Businessman, Political & Social worker.

Active Member, Congress Party, 1998; Vice -President, Youth Congress (Shimla City), 2003-2005; Vice-President, State Youth Congress; State General Secretary, Indian Youth Congress; Vice- President, State and Shimla Lok Sabha Constituency PYC; National Coordinator, IYC; Member, Zila Parishad, (Chamyana Ward No-22), Distt. Shimla, (twice) 2005 & 2010; Chairman, Zila Parishad, Shimla, 27th January, 2011 to January, 2013; Secretary, AICC, 2021; and Co-Incharge AICC, Assam Congress Committee.

Elected to the State Legislative Assembly in December 2012; re-elected in December, 2017; Member, Public Undertakings, Subordinate Legislation and Rules Committees, 2013-17; and Public Undertakings Committee, 2018-2020; Subordinate Legislation,  Rules Committee 2018-22; Public Accounts  Committees 2020; Estimates Committee, 2021-2022.

Elected for the third consecutive term in December, 2022; and inducted into Council of Minister as Rural Development & Panchayati Raj Minister on 8th January, 2023.

Favourite Pastime: Music, cricket, travelling and reading.

References

1977 births
Living people
21st-century Indian politicians
Indian National Congress politicians from Himachal Pradesh
Indian Youth Congress
Himachal Pradesh MLAs 2012–2017
Himachal Pradesh MLAs 2017–2022
Himachal Pradesh MLAs 2022–2027